Victoria Medal may refer to:
 Victoria Medal (geography), by the Royal Geographical Society
 Victoria Medal of Honour, by the Royal Horticultural Society
 Victoria Cross, military medal of the British Commonwealth